Mykonos-Manto Mavrogenous Airport  is the international airport of the Greek island of Mykonos, located  from the town of Mykonos. It serves flights to domestic and European metropolitan destinations due to the island being a popular leisure destination.

History 
The airport first operated in 1971.

During the off-peak tourist season the airport has limited flight connections and operating hours. On the other hand, during the 2014 peak summer season it was found necessary to severely limit general aviation activity, allowing only a technical stop of 2 hours. For the summer of 2016, NOTAM B0335/16 introduces a similar limitation, but now even down to a one hour's stop.

In December 2015, the privatisation of Mykonos International Airport and 13 other regional airports of Greece was finalised with the signing of the agreement between the Fraport AG/Copelouzos Group joint venture and the state privatisation fund. "We signed the deal today," the head of Greece's privatisation agency HRADF, Stergios Pitsiorlas, told Reuters. According to the agreement, the joint venture will operate the 14 airports (including Mykonos International Airport) for 40 years.

Fraport started managing the airport from 11 April 2017. On 22 March 2017, the Fraport-Greece presented its master plan for the 14 regional airports including the Mykonos Airport. Immediate actions that will be implemented at the airports as soon as Fraport Greece takes over operations before the launch of the Summer 2017 season include general clean-up, decrease wait times to check in and reduce flight delays, upgrading sanitary facilities as well as enhancing services and offering new free Internet connection (WiFi).

The following summarizes the enhancement changes that will be implemented for Mykonos Airport under Fraport Greece's investment plan until 2021:

 New fire station
 Reorganizing apron
 33 percent increase in the number of check-in counters (from 12 to 16)
 17 percent increase in the number of departure gates (from 6 to 7)
 25 percent increase in the number of security-check lanes (from 4 to 5)

Airlines and destinations
The following airlines operate regular scheduled and charter flights at Mykonos Airport:

Traffic figures

The annual passenger traffic data is sourced from the Hellenic Civil Aviation Authority (CAA)  until 2016 and from 2017 and later from the official website of the airport.

Traffic statistics by country (2022)

Ground transport 
The transfer time from the town to the airport is about 10 minutes.

Transit bus service is provided between the Airport and the city of Mykonos (Chora) and other destinations, (only during summer season).

By Car : Mykonos Airport is located 3.5 km from the city of Mykonos (Chora) and is easily accessible via Mykonos provincial road. The journey to and from the city centre takes about 10 minutes. Ornos, Psarrou, Platis Gialos are 3.5 km away from the airport and the journey from the Airport takes about 10–15 minutes.

By Taxi : 24/7 taxi service is available outside the Mykonos Airport Terminal building. The journey from the Airport to the city of Mykonos (Chora) is about 10 minutes and costs 20€ (2022).

See also
Transport in Greece

References

External links

Official website
Airport information

Airports in Greece
Buildings and structures in Mykonos
1971 establishments in Greece